Tomten har åkt hem is a Christmas album by BAO, released on 19 November 2012.

Track listing

Charts

Weekly charts

Year-end charts

References

2012 Christmas albums
Benny Anderssons orkester albums
Christmas albums by Swedish artists
Pop Christmas albums